St. Thomas's Church, Huron Street is a parish of the Anglican Church of Canada in Toronto, Ontario. One of the earliest Anglo-Catholic congregations in Canada, it was established in 1874, moving twice before settling into its present building, adjacent to the Annex on the western edge of the University of Toronto's downtown campus.

The liturgy and music at St. Thomas's make it a "destination" church. Many people who do not live within the boundaries of the parish attend services, especially students, staff, and faculty at the University of Toronto. The parish describes itself as "an active and welcoming Anglo-Catholic parish rooted in Scripture, Reason, and Tradition."

History
The Arts and Crafts building, designed by architect and parishioner Eden Smith (1858–1949), was opened on January 17, 1893. The First World War Memorial Baptistery with Bromsgrove Guild stained-glass windows was completed in 1922.

The aesthetic theorist and poet T. E. Hulme attended St Thomas's while living in Toronto briefly in 1906 after leaving Cambridge University. He is an important figure in Modernist literature, influencing, among others, Ezra Pound and T.S. Eliot. The world-famous English pianist Gerald Moore (1899–1987) grew up and obtained most of his music education in Toronto. In his early life, he was sub-organist at St Thomas's.

The parish's logo was designed by Allan Fleming for its centenary celebrations in 1974.

Tradition
The church is known for its high standards in music and liturgy, and is nicknamed "Smoky Tom's" for its use of generous quantities of incense. Liturgy at St. Thomas's is more formal and complex than would be encountered in all but a few Canadian Anglican churches today.

St. Thomas's draws from the English high-church tradition within Anglo-Catholicism, distinct from the Anglo-Papalist branch, which takes its inspiration from contemporary Roman Catholicism. This tradition, as former rector Fr. Roy Hoult explains, sought

Trinity College and Wycliffe College
The church has had a long relationship with Trinity College and, more recently, with Wycliffe College. As recently as the late 1930s, Wycliffe banned its students from entering St. Thomas's. Nowadays, however, Wycliffe College seminarians serve regularly during the academic term, involved in the liturgy and many aspects of parish, such as the Friday Food Ministry.

Liturgy and music
St. Thomas's has two full-time priests, the Rector and the Associate Priest, who are assisted by honorary associate priests. There is also a Director of Music and Associate Organist.

St. Thomas's is notable for its intricate liturgy. Of interest is its dedicated Acolytes' Guild, and its preservation of complex liturgical roles and minor orders like that of the subdiaconate, which are no longer found in the vast majority of Anglicanism and Western Christianity as a whole, including in Roman Catholicism.

Music is an important part of the liturgy at St. Thomas's and the high calibre of the music program attracts people to St Thomas's. From 1989 to July 2016, the parish's Organist and Choirmaster was John Tuttle. He was also the founding artistic director of the semi-professional Exultate Chamber Singers and previously directed the Hart House Chorus at the University of Toronto, where he has been the Director of Music at Trinity College since 2009 and University Organist since 1979. The famous English accompanist Gerald Moore, who grew up in Toronto, was briefly an assistant organist at St. Thomas's. There are three choral services each Sunday. The choristers are mainly volunteers, with paid section leads. To date, the choir has toured to the U.K. three times in 2005, 2010, and 2013 to serve as choir-in-residence in cathedrals during the summer. Elizabeth Anderson was Interim Organist and Choirmaster from July 2016 until August 2017.  From August 2017 to December 2018, Matthew Larkin was Organist and Director of Music. Matthew Whitfield was Organist and Director of Music from January 2019 to August 2022. Elizabeth Anderson was appointed Interim Director of Music in September 2022, and appointed Director of Music in March 2023. Manuel Piazza was also appointed Assistant Director of Music in the same month.

St. Thomas's celebrates daily Low Mass and Morning & Evening Prayer. Low Mass is celebrated in the Lady Chapel at 12:15 pm on Monday, Wednesday and Friday, at 5:30 pm on Tuesday and Thursday, and at 10:00 am on Saturday. Morning Prayer is said in the chancel from Monday to Friday at 8:30 am, and on Saturday at 9:30 am. Evening Prayer is said in the chancel as well from Monday to Friday at 5:00 pm.

On Sundays, the services are:

 Mattins, 7:30 a.m. & Low Mass, 8:00 a.m. Uses the 1962 Canadian Book of Common Prayer.

 Sung Mass, 9:30 a.m.: A contemporary-language service (includes choral music) with the priest facing westward, using the 1985 Book of Alternative Services and the Revised Common Lectionary readings.
 High Mass, 11:00 a.m.: A traditional-language eastward-facing service (includes choral music) using a re-ordered version of the 1962 Canadian Book of Common Prayer, and the Revised Common Lectionary readings.
 Evensong & Devotions, 5:00 p.m.: Evensong (using the 1962 BCP) and Devotions (includes choral music).

Sung Mass, High Mass, and Evensong & Devotions are livestreamed. See the parish website.

Major Feast Days are usually observed with one or two Low Masses during the day and a Procession and High Mass at 6:00 pm. Service details, livestream links, and service leaflets are posted on the parish website.

Culture
St. Thomas's publishes an e-newsletter from the rector called The Thurible weekly. The parish sponsors a Friday Food Ministry program and has a long tradition of refugee sponsorship. All are supported by volunteers from the parish and the community. It also hosts meetings of the Society of Mary.

Many St. Thomas's parishioners are active as performers, writers, and artists, and the church has participated in events like Nuit Blanche and Doors Open Toronto. Many of its younger parishioners attend the nearby campus of the University of Toronto, and university-oriented bible studies are held.

Christian education
On Sunday mornings, there is a small church school and a nursery school. The church also conducts an adult Christian education program, including programs targeted to young adults, Bible study series during the Lent and Advent seasons, discussion groups, and occasional lectures. From 2006 to 2015, there was also an active St Elmo's Youth Group; some of its members have gone on to serve as choristers and acolytes.

Gallery

See also
List of Anglican churches in Toronto
Parkdale Deanery

Further reading

References

External links

St Thomas's Anglican Church, Huron Street
Parish YouTube channel: Sunday Sung Mass (9:30 am), High Mass (11:00 am), and Evensong and Devotions (3:00 pm) are livestreamed weekly. 

Thomas
Thomas Anglican Church
Religious organizations established in 1874
1874 establishments in Ontario
Thomas